The Yemeni–Ottoman conflicts were a series of conflicts between the Ottoman Empire and Zaidi tribes in Upper Yemen, which began in 1538 and ended with the signing of the Treaty of Daan on 9 October 1911.

Yemeni expedition of 1538 
The first Ottoman attempt to conquer Yemen occurred in 1538, after the end of Mamluk rule in Yemen following the end of the Ottoman–Mamluk War (1516–17).

The Ottomans weren't able to capture cities north of Sana'a in Upper Yemen such as Sa'dah, Shaharah and Hajjah remained in the hands of Yemeni Zaidi imams.

Yemeni expedition of the 1630s 
Another Ottoman attempt to conquer Yemen occurred in the 1630s. However, this expedition ended in a decisive victory for the Yemeni Zaidi imams, and the Yemeni imams were able to extend their domains from Asir to Hadramaut.

Muhammad Ali's Yemeni expedition 
In the 18th century, the Zaidi State fractured, resulting in the creation of many small Yemeni states such as the Sultanate of Lahej. However, the Ottomans initially proved reluctant to try to reassert their authority in Yemen. In the 1830s, the Ottomans requested Muhammad Ali of Egypt to try to conquer the Arabian peninsula (including Yemen). However, this was met with opposition from the British Empire, which opted to occupy Aden in January 1839. In April 1840, due to pressure from Russia, Austria, and the British Empire, Muhammad Ali withdrew from the Arabian peninsula.

Yemeni expedition of 1849 
In 1849, the Ottomans returned to Yemen once more. In April, they captured Al Hudaydah, and in July, they entered Sana'a on the invitation of the Imam, who wished for Yemen to become a vassal state under Ottoman protection. This decision was regarded as treacherous by locals, and soon an open revolt occurred. Soon, the Ottomans were forced to withdraw.

Yemeni expedition of 1872 
In 1872, the Ottomans were invited to occupy Sana'a by local nobles who were irritated by the alleged incompetence of the Zaidi imam, allowing the Ottomans to finally conquer Yemen and establish the Yemen Vilayet.

Yemeni rebellion of 1891 
In 1891, a vicious rebellion occurred in Yemen, due to the irreligious conduct of the Ottoman Empire.

Yemeni rebellion of 1904 
In 1904, another rebellion occurred in Yemen. While Arab historian Abdul Yaccob reports it as having started in June 1904, Caesar E. Farah reports that the first serious incident took place on 8 November, when an Ottoman garrison was attacked and destroyed at Hafash. After the attack on Hafash, Hajjah and Hajur broke out in rebellion. The rebels then occupied Dhamar and Yarim, and began marching on Taiz and Qatabah.

Within a month of the Imam's uprising, the Zaidis had blocked the road between Sana'a and the port of Hodeida, had cut telegraph wires, suspended caravans and Sana'a was reported as being besieged on 12 December. On 26 December, the rebels captured the Sinan Pasa post on the Sana'a - Hudaydah road. Turkish reinforcements found themselves repeatedly ambushed by the Zaidis, and by 1905 Ottoman casualties stood at more than 25,000.  In early January, Hajjah was under siege by the rebels. On 22 February, the rebels surrounded Ibb and Qatabah. In March, the Ottomans broke the siege of Mabar after 4 days of fighting.

In March 1905, the rebels had captured Yarim, and surrounded Ibb, which they had captured by the third week of May together with Qatabah.

On 5 March, a 4,000 strong Ottoman force departed from Hudaydah to relieve the siege of Sana'a, but was unable to do so. The rebels headed for Manakhah, and laid siege to it. In early March, they captured Hajjah as thousands of Ottoman regulars surrendered. and they captured Manakhah in March.

In April 1905, the Zaidis captured Sana'a, and demanded an armistice should the Ottoman garrison be spared, which was accepted. In June 1905, negotiations ensued, but led to nothing.

Yemeni expedition of 1905 
After the failure of negotiations, Ottoman forces consisting of 6 battalions led by Ahmad Faydi Pasha violated the armistice, and started a three-pronged offensive from Manakhah on 16 July 1905, and captured Sana'a on 29 or 30 August.

In July 1905, the imam of Yemen sent a letter to the Ottomans, detailing his resentment towards the violation of the armistice:

"We ousted them [the Ottomans] from Sana ... we fixed a truce for one year during which there should be no fighting and both parties should have peace without defiance or violation of the terms. When they, however, reached the place to which they had agreed to retire, they reverted to their former deeds admixed with truth and falsehood. They commenced to violate the terms they have concluded and the undertakings they had agreed to, and to commit evil."

By mid-August, the Ottomans had gained the initiative. By the end of that month, they had retaken Abha in Asir. In the south, a Unit moving from Taiz captured Yarim, while another Ottoman force under Feyzi captured Mafraq before advancing on Suq al-Khamis and then while advancing on the road to Saana occupied all positions as far as Khawlan. Feyzi reported he had captured 24 villages, including Jiblah and Badan.

By mid-November, the Ottomans had retaken Amran, Thula, Kawkaban, and Hajjah.

In mid-November, the Ottomans advanced on Shaharah with 10,000 men, in an attempt to crush the Zaidis, but the offensive was abandoned due to the rugged terrain and constant attacks by Zaidi forces, and they withdrew to Hajjah in December, then to Sana'a, and two weeks later to Taiz, with the Yemenis in hot pursuit. Meanwhile, the Yemeni rebels surrounded Amran, and occupied Jabal Dharwah and Al-Yaabir, and later surrounded Sana'a once again. In Hudaydah, the Ottomans regrouped, marching north and recovering control of lost areas near Manakhah. The Ottoman force linked up with another Ottoman force which had been advancing from Zaydiyah to relieve Qifl and recapture Hajjah. In the South, the Ottomans were moving north from Taiz to Yarim after recapturing Suq al-Khamis, after which the Imam offered peace if he could keep Dhamar, Yarim, Amran, Kawkaban, al-Tawilah and Hajjah.

Conclusion and aftermath 
In August 1906, an Ottoman delegation arrived to the Imam, expressing the desire to re-open negotiations, to which the Imam reportedly responded with by stating his desire to end the bloodshed. Five years of negotiations ensued, and ended with the signing of the Treaty of Daan on 9 October 1911, which led to Yemen becoming a vassal state of the Ottoman Empire. It was effective for 7 years, until the Imam of Yemen capitalized on the Ottoman collapse in World War I and created the Mutawakkilite Kingdom of Yemen on 30 October 1918.

Yemeni rebellion of 1911 
In early 1911, the Imam, frustrated by the lack of progress in the negotiations, began another revolt against the Ottomans. Armed Yemeni rebel bands arrived in Sanaa on 12 January 1911, and soon took over the city. The rebellion collapsed near the end of April.

Notes

References 

Wars involving the Ottoman Empire
Ottoman period in Yemen